Pallbearer is an American doom metal band from Little Rock, Arkansas, formed in 2008.

History
Pallbearer was formed in 2008 in Little Rock, Arkansas by Brett Campbell and Joseph D. Rowland. The two met as students at the University of Central Arkansas and were previously in an experimental project, called Sports. After adding Devin Holt on second guitar and a drummer, Pallbearer recorded and self-released a three-song demo in 2010. The group was signed by Profound Lore Records in 2011. Pallbearer's first full length Sorrow and Extinction was released in 2012, earning immediate critical success. Sorrow and Extinction was awarded Best New Music status by Pitchfork and was cited amongst the best albums of the year by Spin and NPR. 

The line up was solidified by the addition of Mark Lierly (drums) after the recording of the debut LP. Pallbearer's 2014 album, Foundations of Burden was recorded and produced by Billy Anderson at Type Foundry Studio in Portland, Oregon. The album was awarded Best New Music status by Pitchfork. The album topped Decibel magazine's Album of the Year list.

In the summer of 2016, the band returned to Little Rock to record their third full-length, Heartless, at Fellowship Hall Sound studios. The mix was done by Joe Barresi. The official video for the opening track, "I Saw the End," was released in March 2017, along with the album. Heartless debuted at #187 on the Billboard Top 200 Album chart in the U.S. and #42 on the Billboard Top Current Albums chart. It ranks on Stereogum's 50 Best Albums of 2017 So Far. Heartless marked the band moving away from their traditional metal and doom roots, with the album demonstrating grunge, classic rock, and prog influences such as The Smashing Pumpkins, Camel, Pink Floyd, Kansas, and Brian Eno. PopMatters, in reviewing the album, wrote "Pallbearer reaches universality previously hit by artists like the Beatles on Abbey Road or Pink Floyd at their most explorative." 

In October 2017, the band was featured in The New York Times Magazine in an essay by cultural critic David Rees. Acknowledging the band's expanding appeal and sonic horizons, Rees described Pallbearer as "one of the most resonant emotional campaigns in American rock music." They were awarded the 2017 Metal Hammer Golden God award for Best Underground Band. Thrillist also named Pallbearer the best band from Arkansas in their Best Bands From Every State rankings. Their fourth album, Forgotten Days, was released in October 2020 and was described by Consequence of Sound as "Perhaps the best doom metal album of 2020".

Band members

Current
 Brett Campbell – lead vocals, guitar, synthesizer (2008–present)
 Joseph D. Rowland – bass, lead and backing vocals, electric and acoustic piano, synthesizer (2008–present)
 Devin Holt – guitar, backing vocals (2008–present)
 Mark Lierly – drums (2012–present)

Former
 David Dobbs – drums (2008–2009)
 Zach Stine – drums (2009–2012)
 Chuck Schaaf – drums (2012)

Timeline

Discography

Studio albums
 Sorrow and Extinction (Profound Lore Records, 2012)
 Foundations of Burden (Profound Lore Records, 2014) US #90
 Heartless (Profound Lore Records, 2017) US #187 GER #98
 Forgotten Days (Nuclear Blast, 2020)

EPs
 2010 Demo (2010)
 Fear and Fury (2016)

Singles
 "Fear and Fury" (2015)
 "Dropout" (2018)
 "Atlantis" (2019)

References

External links

Pallbearer at Encyclopaedia Metallum

2008 establishments in Arkansas
American doom metal musical groups
Heavy metal musical groups from Arkansas
Musical groups from Little Rock, Arkansas
Musical groups established in 2008
Musical quartets
Profound Lore Records artists
Nuclear Blast artists